Frederic, Frederick or Fred Lincoln may refer to:

Frederic W. Lincoln Jr. (1817–1898), American politician, mayor of Boston in the 1850s and 1860s
Frederick Charles Lincoln (1892–1960), American ornithologist
Frederic W. Lincoln IV (1898–1968), American member of Rockefeller family
Fred Lincoln (umpire) (1878–1940), baseball umpire
Fred J. Lincoln (1936–2013), American film director, producer, screenwriter, actor, editor and cinematographer of pornographic films